This is a list of all commanders, deputy commanders, senior enlisted leaders, and chiefs of staff of the United States Transportation Command.

Current combatant command staff
  Jacqueline Van Ovost, Commander
  John P. Sullivan, Deputy Commander
  Vincent B. Barker, Chief of Staff
  Will Cooper, Director, Manpower and Personnel (TCJ1)
  Laura Lenderman, Director, Operations (TCJ3)
  Robert Brisson, Deputy Director, Operations
  Charles D. Bolton, Chief, Global Operations Center
  Philip E. Sobeck, Director, Strategy, Capabilities, Policy, Programs, and Logistics (TCJ5/4)
  Mark A. Cyr, Deputy Director, Strategy, Capabilities, Policy, Programs, and Logistics
  Michelle L. Hayworth, Director, Command, Control, Communications and Cyber Systems (TCJ6)
  Terri Dilly, Chief Financial Officer and Director, Program Analysis and Financial Management (TCJ8)

List of commanders of the United States Transportation Command

List of deputy commanders of the United States Transportation Command

List of senior enlisted leaders of the United States Transportation Command

List of chiefs of staff of the United States Transportation Command

See also
 United States Transportation Command
 Leadership of the United States Africa Command
 Leadership of the United States European Command
 Leadership of the United States Indo-Pacific Command
 Leadership of the United States Northern Command
 Leadership of the United States Space Command
 Leadership of the United States Cyber Command
 Leadership of the United States Strategic Command

References

Lists of American military personnel